Chang Chih-Feng (born 22 April 1981 in Pingtung County, Taiwan) is a Taiwanese professional basketball coach. He formerly played for the Dacin Tigers of the Super Basketball League.

A high-school superstar, Chang have started his professional career early with the historical Chinese Basketball Alliance of Taiwan right before the league's termination in 1999.  Since then, Chang had competed in the amateur Division A conference (甲組聯賽) of Taiwan and the second-tier National Basketball League of the People's Republic of China until the inauguration of the semi-pro Super Basketball League (SBL) in Taiwan in 2003.  Chang currently plays shooting guard for the Dacin Tigers of the SBL where he won two stealing champion titles in addition to two most valuable player (MVP) awards.  Named MVP for both the 2008-2009 regular season and the 2009 championship series against the then-defending champions Taiwan Beer, he led the Tigers to their first championship in franchise history.

Chang Chih-Feng was also a member of the Chinese Taipei men's national basketball team when his squad registered an improved fifth-place finish at FIBA Asia Championship 2009.  He averaged 7.4 points per game in the tournament.

Although widely recognized as a diligent athlete and especially a tenacious defender, Chang's playing style is somewhat controversial as he is often accused of committing flagrant fouls purposely.

On February 8, 2022, Chang signed with Taoyuan Leopards of the T1 League. He suffered a season-ending hand injury in a game against the TaiwanBeer HeroBears on April 5, 2022.

Chang is nicknamed "Beast Master" for his ability to guard Lin Chih-chieh, who was known as the "Beast".

References

1981 births
Living people
Shooting guards
Small forwards
Sportspeople from Taichung
Taiwanese men's basketball players
Taoyuan Leopards players
T1 League players
Chinese Taipei men's national basketball team players
Dacin Tigers players
Super Basketball League players
LUCKIPar players